This was the first edition of the event.

Jaime Yzaga won the title, defeating Jim Pugh 0–6, 7–6, 6–1 in the final.

Seeds

  Jaime Yzaga (champion)
  Andre Agassi (first round)
  Nduka Odizor (first round)
  Jim Pugh (final)
  Ben Testerman (quarterfinals)
  Johan Carlsson (first round)
  Éric Winogradsky (second round, withdrew)
  Barry Moir (first round)

Draw

Finals

Top half

Bottom half

References

 Main Draw

OTB Open
1987 Grand Prix (tennis)